Minority Opinion, released internationally as The Unfair, is a 2015 South Korean courtroom drama film written and directed by Kim Sung-je, starring Yoon Kye-sang, Yoo Hae-jin and Kim Ok-bin. It was adapted from Son A-ram's novel of the same name, which in turn was based on the "Yongsan tragedy," in which 40 tenants protesting against insufficient compensation for the urban renewal redevelopment of their Yongsan neighborhood clashed with riot police on January 20, 2009, that resulted in the death of five tenant-evictees and one police officer.

Plot
Tenants who have been evicted from their homes are in the middle of a sit-in protest, when the police arrive. A 20-year-old police officer and a 16-year-old boy, the son of a demonstrator, end up dead. The boy's father, Park Jae-ho gets arrested for the cop's death, but he insists it was self-defense and that he had only been trying to protect his son from being beaten by the riot police. Rookie public defender Yoon Jin-won is initially doubtful of Park's claims, until he gets approached by reporter Gong Soo-kyung who has her own suspicions about the government's account of the incident. Yoon then teams up with fellow lawyer Jang Dae-seok to pursue the truth through a jury trial.

Cast

Yoon Kye-sang as Yoon Jin-won
Yoo Hae-jin as Jang Dae-seok
Kim Ok-bin as Gong Soo-kyung
Lee Geung-young as Park Jae-ho
Jang Gwang as Kim Hee-taek's father
Kim Eui-sung as Prosecutor
Kwon Hae-hyo as Judge
Kim Hyeong-jong as Kim Soo-man
Noh Young-hak as Kim Hee-taek
Oh Yeon-ah as Yoo In-ha
Kwak In-joon as Park Kyung-chul
Uhm Tae-goo as Lee Seung-joon
Jo Bok-rae as Public prosecutor
Kim Jong-soo as Jo Goo-hwan
Park Gyu-chae as Professor Yeom
Ahn Sang-woo as Moon Hee-sung
Choi Soo-han as Park Shin-woo
Yoon Dong-hwan as Assistant prosecutor general
Park Hae-soo as Goo-hwan's assistant
Park Chul-min as Judge Kim Joon-bae (cameo)

Release
The shoot wrapped on June 3, 2013, but because of the film's political content, it took two years to find a distributor. Minority Opinion received a theatrical release on June 24, 2015.

Awards and nominations

See also
Two Doors, a 2012 documentary about the same incident

References

External links
 

2015 films
South Korean legal films
2010s South Korean films
Cinema Service films